Aziz al-Abub (also known as Ibrahim al-Nadhir or al-Nahdhir) was a Lebanese psychiatrist and medical torture expert affiliated with Hezbollah. Al-Abub is accused of having used brainwashing, drugs, and physical torture on Central Intelligence Agency (CIA) operatives in Beirut, in particular, the torture of CIA station chief William Francis Buckley.

See also
 Prison 209

References

Further reading
 

Hezbollah members
Lebanese Islamists
Hezbolla
Lebanese psychiatrists
20th-century Lebanese physicians
Possibly living people
Year of birth missing